Cann is a village and civil parish in the county of Dorset in southern England. In the 2011 census the parish—which includes HM Prison Guys Marsh—had a population of 822.

References

External links 

Villages in Dorset
Civil parishes in Dorset